Salvatore Lauricella (18 May 1922 – 7 November 1996) was an Italian attorney, politician, and chairman of the Italian Socialist Party.

He was the father of Giuseppe Lauricella, deputy of the Democratic Party.

Biography
After obtaining a diploma from the "Pitagora" high school in Crotone, he graduated in law practicing the profession of lawyer, following in the footsteps of his father Giuseppe. In 1946, supported by the Italian Socialist Party, he became mayor of the country at the young age of 24. He was confirmed in this office for fourteen terms, until 1990, thus becoming one of the most enduring mayors of Italy.

He was regional secretary of the PSI in Sicily, as well as creator and promoter of the first center-left government in Italy, which was formed in the Sicilian Region through the agreement of the Christian Democracy of Giuseppe D'Angelo.

He was a national deputy from 1963, to 1981 and then from 1992 to 1994, in 1968 he became Minister for Scientific Research. In 1970 he became Minister of Public Works, in the Rumor and Colombo governments, and remained in office until 1974.

Within the PSI he joined the faction of Francesco De Martino. In 1976 he was among the candidates for the secretary of the PSI but eventually became the vice of Bettino Craxi; two years later he became the President of the PSI. In 1981 he left the national parliament and was elected regional deputy in Sicily. For two terms (1981 – 1991) he was president of the Sicilian Regional Assembly.

In 1992 he returned to the Chamber and in March 1994, after the Mani Pulite investigation and the crumbling of the PSI, he retired to private life.

References

1922 births
1996 deaths
Italian Socialist Party politicians
People from Agrigento
Politicians from the Province of Agrigento